The Roman pharaohs, rarely referred to as ancient Egypt's Thirty-fourth Dynasty,  were the Roman emperors in their capacity as rulers of Egypt, especially in Egyptology. After Egypt was incorporated into the Roman Empire in 30 BC, the people and especially the priesthood of the country continued to recognize the Roman emperors as pharaohs, according them traditional pharaonic titularies and depicting them with traditional pharaonic garb, engaging in traditional pharaonic activities, in artwork and at temples throughout Egypt.

Though the Egyptians themselves considered the Romans to be their pharaohs and the legitimate successors of the ancient pharaohs, the emperors themselves never adopted any pharaonic titles or traditions outside of Egypt, as these would have been hard to justify in the Roman world at large. Most emperors probably cared little of the status accorded to them by the Egyptians and rarely visited the province more than once in their lifetime. Their role as god-kings was only ever officially acknowledged by the Egyptians themselves. This was a sharp contrast to the preceding dynasty of the Hellenistic Ptolemaic Kingdom, who had spent the majority of their lives in Egypt. Pharaohs before Egypt's incorporation into the Achaemenid Empire in the Late Period had also all ruled the country from within Egypt. Egypt was, however, governed differently from other Roman provinces, with emperors hand-picking governors for the region and often treating it more like a personal possession than a province. Though not all emperors were recognized as pharaohs, Egyptian religion demanded the presence of a pharaoh to act as the intermediate between humanity and the gods. The emperors filling this role proved to be the most simple solution, and was similar to how the Persians had been regarded as pharaohs centuries prior (constituting the Twenty-seventh and Thirty-first dynasties).

Though Egypt continued to be a part of the Roman Empire until it was conquered by the Rashidun Caliphate in 641 AD, the last Roman emperor to be conferred the title of pharaoh was Maximinus Daza (reigned 311–313 AD). By his time, the view of Romans as pharaohs had already been declining for some time due to Egypt being on the periphery of the Roman Empire (in contrast to the traditional pharaonic view of Egypt as the center of the world). The spread of Christianity throughout the empire in the 4th century, and the transformation of Egypt's capital Alexandria into a major Christian center, decisively ended the tradition, due to the new religion being incompatible with the traditional implications of being pharaoh.

The names of the emperors were written in hieroglyphs phonetically, based on the renditions of their names in Greek. This way of rendering the names led to the Roman pharaohs having a significant impact on modern Egyptology since the readings of their names marked an important step in the decipherment of hieroglyphs.

History 
Cleopatra VII had affairs with Roman dictator Julius Caesar and Roman general Mark Antony, but it was not until after her 30 BC suicide (after Mark Antony's defeat against Octavian, who became Emperor Augustus) that Egypt became a province of the Roman Republic. Subsequent Roman emperors were accorded the title of pharaoh, although exclusively while in Egypt. As such, not all Roman emperors were recognized as pharaohs. Although Octavian made a point of not taking the Pharaonic crown when he conquered Egypt, which would have been difficult to justify to the wider empire considering the vast amount of propaganda which he had spread about the "exotic" behavior of Cleopatra and Antony, the native population of Egypt regarded him as the pharaoh succeeding Cleopatra and Caesarion. Depictions of Octavian, now called Augustus, in traditional pharaonic garbs (wearing different crowns and the traditional kilt) and sacrificing goods to various Egyptian gods were made as early as around 15 BC and they are present in the Temple of Dendur, built by Gaius Petronius, the Roman governor of Egypt. Even earlier than that, Augustus had been accorded royal titles in the Egyptian version of a 29 BC stele made by Cornelius Gallus, despite royal titles not being present in the Latin or Greek-language versions of the same text.

Unlike the preceding Ptolemaic pharaohs and pharaohs of other previous foreign dynasties, the Roman emperors were rarely physically present in Egypt. As such, the traditional role of the pharaoh, a living embodiment of the gods and cosmic order, was somewhat harder to justify; an emperor rarely visited the province more than once in their lifetime, a sharp contrast to previous pharaohs who had spent a majority of their lives in Egypt. Even then, Egypt was hugely important to the empire as it was highly fertile and the richest region of the Mediterranean. Egypt was governed differently from other provinces, emperors treating it more like a personal possession than a province; hand-picking governors and administering it without the Roman Senate's interference; senators were rarely made governors of Egypt and they were even typically barred from visiting the province without explicit permission.

Vespasian (69–79) was the first emperor since Augustus to appear in Egypt. At Alexandria he was hailed as pharaoh; recalling the welcome of Alexander the Great at the Oracle of Zeus-Ammon of the Siwa Oasis, Vespasian was proclaimed the son of the creator-deity Amun (Zeus-Ammon), in the style of the ancient pharaohs, and an incarnation of Serapis in the manner of the Ptolemies. As pharaonic precedent demanded, Vespasian demonstrated his divine election by the traditional methods of spitting on and trampling a blind and crippled man, thereby miraculously healing him.To the Egyptians, their religion demanded that there was a pharaoh to act as the intermediary between the gods and humanity. As such, the emperors continued to be regarded as pharaohs since this proved the most simple solution, disregarding the actual political situation, similar to how Egypt had regarded the Persians or Greeks before the Romans. The abstract nature of the role of these "Roman pharaohs" ensured that the priests of Egypt could demonstrate their loyalty both to their traditional ways and to the new foreign ruler. The Roman emperors themselves mostly ignored the status accorded to them by the Egyptians; in Latin and Greek their titles continued to be Roman only (Imperator in Latin and Autokrator in Greek) and their role as god-kings was only ever acknowledged domestically by the Egyptians themselves. Not all Egyptians were positively inclined towards the Roman emperors; there were a handful of Egyptian revolts against Roman rules and there are surviving examples of texts by Egyptian priests lamenting Roman rule of Egypt and calling for the reinstatement of a native dynasty of pharaohs.

As Christianity became more and more accepted within the empire, eventually becoming the state religion, emperors no longer found it possible to accept the traditional implications of being pharaoh (a position firmly rooted in the Egyptian religion) and by the early 4th century, Alexandria itself, the capital of Egypt since the time of Alexander the Great, had become a major center of Christianity. By this point, the view of the Romans as pharaohs had already declined somewhat; Egypt being on the periphery of the Roman Empire was much different from the traditional pharaonic view of Egypt as the center of the world. This was evident in the imperial pharaonic titulatures; though early emperors had been given elaborate titulatures similar to those of the Ptolemies and native pharaohs before them, no emperor after Marcus Aurelius (161–180) is attested by more than a nomen (though still written in royal cartouches). Although there continued to be Roman emperors for centuries, until the Fall of Constantinople in 1453 AD, and Egypt continued to be a part of the empire until 641 AD, the last Roman emperor to be conferred the title of pharaoh was Maximinus Daza (reigned 311–313 AD).

Despite actual dynastic relationships (there were at least four distinct dynasties of Roman emperors between Augustus and Maximinus Daza), the period of Roman rule over Egypt in its entirety is sometimes referred to as the Thirty-fourth Dynasty. Some nineteenth century Coptic scholars, such as Mikhail Sharubim and Rifa'a al-Tahtawi, split the Roman emperors into two dynasties, a Thirty-fourth Dynasty for pagan emperors and a Thirty-fifth Dynasty encompassing Christian emperors from Theodosius I to the Muslim conquest of Egypt in 641 AD, although no Christian Roman emperor was ever referred to as pharaoh by the population of ancient Egypt.

Impact on Egyptology 

The pharaonic titularies of the Roman emperors played a highly important role in modern Egyptology. A central figure in the decipherment of ancient Egyptian hieroglyphics was the French orientalist Jean-François Champollion (1790–1832). Champollion's 1822 Lettre à M. Dacier is the most famous publication in all of Egyptology and is sometimes considered the beginning of the discipline itself. The letter included Champollion's proposed readings of pharaonic cartouches from the Ptolemaic and Roman periods, based on previous attempts and comparisons between different cartouches. The decipherment of names of emperors, and in particular the Egyptian renditions of titles like Caesar and autokrator, were a highly important part of the process.

Though there would be further developments before full-length hieroglyphic texts could be read with reasonable accuracy, Champollion's discoveries in phonetic hieroglyphics were highly impactful. By the time of the publication of the letter, which included a list of identified phonetic hieroglyphic signs, Champollion did not expect that the phonetic values he discovered could be applied to names of pre-Ptolemaic pharaohs as well. His subsequent realization, at some point later in 1822 or in 1823, that hieroglyphic writing was often a combination of phonetic and ideographic (i.e. symbols of words or ideas) laid the groundwork for future successful decipherment efforts and led Champollion to begin focusing on not only deciphering the symbols but also to translate the underlying language.

List of emperor-pharaohs 

This list only contains emperors who are attested in hieroglyphics (i.e. with pharaonic titles), per von Beckerath (1984).

Notes

References

Bibliography

Web sources 
 
 

Roman Egypt
Dynasties of ancient Egypt